Manoj Yadava is an Indian police officer who is the current Director general of police of Haryana. He had previously held the post of joint director of the Intelligence Bureau at the Union Home Ministry (MHA).

Early life 
Yadava was born in Aligarh, Uttar Pradesh, India.

His Son Aditya Vikram Yadav, IAS has secured the rank 72 in UPSC 2018 and Currently serving as the Sub Divisional Officer (SDO) Civil of Gohpur Sub-division.

Career 
Yadava was appointed to the IPS in 1988. He has worked as SP in many districts of Haryana.

He joined the Intelligence Bureau in February 2003.

On February 18, 2019 he was appointed as Director General of Police, Haryana. On 7 Jan 2021 Haryana govt extended his tenure till further orders.

He was replaced by the incumbent Prashanta Kumar Agrawal, an IPS officer of the 1988 batch on 16 August 2021.

See also 
Director general of police

References 

Living people
Indian Police Service officers
Indian police chiefs
People from Aligarh district
Year of birth missing (living people)

8. https://www.drishtiias.com/state-pcs-current-affairs/prashanta-kumar-agrawal-is-the-new-haryana-director-general-of-police-dgp